The Aigburth is a skyscraper located in the Mid-levels district of Hong Kong. The building was completed in 1999. It was designed by architectural firm Wong Tung & Partners, and was developed by Kerry Properties Limited. The Aigburth, which stands as the 66th-tallest building in Hong Kong, is composed entirely of residential units. It is an example of postmodern architecture.

See also
List of tallest buildings in Hong Kong

References

Buildings and structures completed in 1999
Residential skyscrapers in Hong Kong
1999 establishments in Hong Kong